The Forêt de Bouconne is located in southwest France, on the border of the departments of Gers and Haute-Garonne about thirty kilometres west of Toulouse. It also includes privately owned woods and woods belonging to the local communes of L'Isle-Jourdain, Lévignac-sur-Save, Montaigut-sur-Save. It is the only large forest near Toulouse. It hosts a leisure centre and outdoor recreation areas.

The Forêt de Bouconne is traversed by many paths used by walkers, mountain bikers and horse riders.

History
Up until the Middle Ages, the forest extended much further than its present boundaries. To the south it reached the Forêt de Fabas and the Forêt de Mauboussin near Esparron., still-existing fragments of the once much larger forest.

Fauna and flora
The dominant tree species in the forest are sessile oak, pine and sweet chestnut. Among the other trees present are pedunculate oak, cork oak, alder, hornbeam, lime, service tree, ash, Nordmann fir, red oak and Scots pine.

It is home to wild boar and roe deer. Other smaller mammal species are present such as the genet, fox and badger. The short-toed eagle hunts on its periphery.

See also
List of forests in France

References

External links
Website of the Base de Loisirs of the Forêt de Bouconne 

Bouconne
Geography of Gers
Geography of Haute-Garonne
Tourist attractions in Gers
Tourist attractions in Haute-Garonne